Røkland is a village in the municipality of Saltdal in Nordland county, Norway. European route E06 and the Nordland Line both pass through the village. Røkland Station is a train station along the Nordland Line.

The  village has a population (2011) of 451.

References

Saltdal
Villages in Nordland
Populated places of Arctic Norway